The  is a kofun burial mound located in the Wakibukuro neighborhood of the town of Wakasa, Fukui in the Hokuriku region of Japan. The site was designated a National Historic Site of Japan in 1935. It is the largest keyhole-shaped tumulus in the Wakasa region and was built from the end of the 4th century to the early 5th century AD.

Overview
The Jōnozuka Kofun is one of a group of seven kofun located in central Wakasa at the western foot of Mount Zenbu. It is located west of the tracks of the JR West Obama Line railway and is in the center of the group. Together with the Nishizuka Kofun and the Nakatsuka Kofun, it was known to local legend as the tomb of one of the "Kings of Wakasa". The entire length is about 100 meters in three tiers, with the posterior circular portion having a diameter of 64 meters, and the width of the anterior rectangular portion at 48 meters with a length of 36 meters. It is orientated to the north. It has retained most of its original shape, and the existence of the former moat can be confirmed. The round portion of the tumulus has a height of six meters and was covered in fukiishi. Fragments of haniwa of various types have been found in the surrounding fields.

Currently, the site of the moat is under rice paddies and the tumulus is surrounded by farmland. The site was excavated in 1992, and in 2008 by ground-penetrating radar.The grave goods discovered, mostly pieces of wood and metal, included items of Korean and Chinese origin, and are displayed at the Wakasa Museum of History and Culture. The name of the person interred is unknown; however from the name of the nearby hill (Zenbuyama, 膳部山), it mostly likely corresponds to the grave of a head of the Kashiwade clan (膳氏), who are recorded in the Kojiki and Nihon Shoki as having served as Kuni no miyatsuko of Wakasa Province since the time of the legendary Emperor Kōgen.

The tumulus is about 30 minutes on foot from Kaminaka Station on the JR West Obama Line.

See also
List of Historic Sites of Japan (Fukui)

References

External links

 Obama city home page 
Cultural Heritage of Fukui Prefecture 

Kofun
History of Fukui Prefecture
Wakasa, Fukui
Historic Sites of Japan
Wakasa Province